Paule Constant (born  25 January 1944 in Gan, Pyrénées-Atlantiques) is a French novelist.

She graduated from Paris-Sorbonne University, with a Ph.D.

Awards
 1998 Prix Goncourt for Confidence pour confidence.
 1989 Grand prize for the novel Académie française

Works

English translations

Novels
 Ouregano, 1980, Gallimard
 Propriété privée, 1981, Gallimard
 Balta, 1983, Gallimard
 Un monde à l'usage des demoiselles, 1987, Gallimard
 White Spirit, 1989, Gallimard -
 Le Grand Ghâpal, 1991, Gallimard - Prix Jackie Bouquin
 La Fille du Gobernator, 1994, Gallimard 
 Confidence pour confidence, 1998, Gallimard, 
 Sucre et secret, 2003, Gallimard,  
 La bête à chagrin: roman, 2007, Gallimard,

Television documentaries
 for Arte : l'Education des Jeunes Filles de la Légion d'Honneur (1992) ;
 for La 5 : in the series Mon héros préféré: "la Princesse de Clèves" (1996) ;
 for France 2 : in the series Les grands fleuves racontés par des écrivains: "L'Amazone" (1997) ;
 for La 5 : - in the series Galilée : "Paule Constant sur les traces de Jean Giono" (2001).

External links
Author's website

1944 births
Living people
People from Béarn
20th-century French novelists
21st-century French novelists
Writers from Nouvelle-Aquitaine
University of Paris alumni
Prix Goncourt winners
Grand Prix du roman de l'Académie française winners
Prix Valery Larbaud winners